The 1993–94 Albanian National Championship was the 55th season of the Albanian National Championship, the top professional league for association football clubs, since its establishment in 1930.

Teams

Stadia and last season

League table

Results

Relegation/promotion playoff

First round 

 Sopoti and Lushnja were relegated to 1994–95 Kategoria e Dytë.

Second round 

 Tomori and Shkumbini were promoted to 1994–95 Albanian National Championship.

Season statistics

Top scorers

Notes

References

Albania - List of final tables (RSSSF)

Kategoria Superiore seasons
1
Albanian Superliga